Kirivong Sok Sen Chey Football Club is an association football club based in Takeo Province, Cambodia.

History
After withdrawal from the 2016 Cambodian League season, the team competed in the 2016 Cambodian Second League. It won promotion and rejoined the 2017 Cambodian League, then was relegated again. After a one-year hiatus, it was announced by the Football Federation of Cambodia that the team was invited to compete in 2019 Cambodian League.

Current squad

Club Staff

References

Football clubs in Cambodia